David Söderberg (born 11 August 1979 in Vörå) is a male hammer thrower from Finland. His personal best throw is 78.83 metres, achieved in July 2003 in Lahti.

He won the bronze medal at the 2003 Summer Universiade and finished fourth at the 2005 Summer Universiade. He also competed at the European Championships in 2002 and 2006 as well as the 2004 Olympic Games without reaching the final.

Competition record

References

1979 births
Living people
People from Vörå
Finnish male hammer throwers
Athletes (track and field) at the 2004 Summer Olympics
Athletes (track and field) at the 2012 Summer Olympics
Athletes (track and field) at the 2016 Summer Olympics
Olympic athletes of Finland
World Athletics Championships athletes for Finland
Universiade medalists in athletics (track and field)
Universiade bronze medalists for Finland
Medalists at the 2003 Summer Universiade
Sportspeople from Ostrobothnia (region)